Calapnita is a genus of Southeast Asian cellar spiders that was first described by Eugène Louis Simon in 1892.

Species
 it contains fifteen species, found in the Philippines, Thailand, Laos, and Indonesia:
Calapnita bariengi Huber, 2017 – Malaysia (Borneo)
Calapnita bario Huber, 2017 – Malaysia (Borneo)
Calapnita bohoi Huber, 2017 – Philippines (Bohoi Is.)
Calapnita bugis Huber, 2017 – Indonesia (Sulawesi)
Calapnita dayak Huber, 2017 – Indonesia (Borneo)
Calapnita dinagat Huber, 2017 – Philippines (Dinagat Is.)
Calapnita lawangan Huber, 2017 – Indonesia (Borneo)
Calapnita loksado Huber, 2017 – Indonesia (Borneo)
Calapnita longa Yao & Li, 2013 – Laos
Calapnita mae Huber, 2017 – Philippines (Mindanao)
Calapnita magaseng Huber, 2017 – Malaysia (Borneo)
Calapnita maragusan Huber, 2017 – Philippines (Mindanao)
Calapnita nunezae Huber, 2017 – Philippines (Mindanao, Camiguin Is.)
Calapnita saluang Huber, 2011 – Thailand, Malaysia (mainland), Indonesia (Sumatra, Java)
Calapnita vermiformis Simon, 1892 (type) – Philippines

See also
 List of Pholcidae species

References

Araneomorphae genera
Pholcidae
Spiders of Asia